Hypervolemia, also known as fluid overload, is the medical condition where there is too much fluid in the blood. The opposite condition is hypovolemia, which is too little fluid volume in the blood. Fluid volume excess in the intravascular compartment occurs due to an increase in total body sodium content and a consequent increase in extracellular body water. The mechanism usually stems from compromised regulatory mechanisms for sodium handling as seen in congestive heart failure (CHF), kidney failure, and liver failure. It may also be caused by excessive intake of sodium from foods, intravenous (IV) solutions and blood transfusions, medications, or diagnostic contrast dyes. Treatment typically includes administration of diuretics and limit the intake of water, fluids, sodium, and salt.

Signs and symptoms
The excess fluid, primarily salt and water, builds up in various locations in the body and leads to an increase in weight, swelling in the legs and arms (peripheral edema), and/or fluid in the abdomen (ascites). Eventually, the fluid enters the air spaces in the lungs (pulmonary edema)  reduces the amount of oxygen that can enter the blood, leading to Anemia and causes shortness of breath (dyspnea) or enters pleural space by transudation (pleural effusion which also causes dyspnea), which is the best indicator of estimating central venous pressure is increased. It can also cause swelling of the face. Fluid can also collect in the lungs when lying down at night, possibly making nighttime breathing and sleeping difficult (paroxysmal nocturnal dyspnea).

Complications
Congestive heart failure is the most common result of fluid overload. Also, it may be associated with hyponatremia (hypervolemic hyponatremia).

Causes
Excessive sodium and/or fluid intake:
 IV therapy containing sodium
 As a transfusion reaction to a rapid blood transfusion.
 High intake of sodium

Sodium and water retention:
Heart failure
Liver cirrhosis
Nephrotic syndrome
Corticosteroid therapy
Hyperaldosteronism
Low protein intake

Fluid shift into the intravascular space:
Fluid remobilization after burn treatment
Administration of hypertonic fluids, e.g. mannitol or hypertonic saline solution
Administration of plasma proteins, such as albumin

Treatment

Treatment includes diuretics, particularly loop diuretics.

See also
 Volume status
 Volume overload
 Fluid balance
 Edema
 Anasarca (swelling of skin)
 Pleural effusion (excess fluid in the pleural cavity)
 Diuretics
 Aquapheresis
 Low pressure receptor zones

References

External links 

Diseases and disorders